Victor Boiko is a Ukrainian politician. He is the former Minister of Environmental Protection of Ukraine and a former Deputy Ministry of Agrarian Policy and Food. He was a member of the People's Party political executive committee.

Early life
Boiko was born on July 6, 1961, Krasnohirka Holovanivsk Raion to a family of farmers. He married Iryna Mykolayivna in 1961. They have two daughters Maryna (1986) and Tetiana (1989).

He studied at the Kirovohrad College of Agricultural Mechanization (1980); Ukrainian Agricultural Academy (1985). He became an electrical engineer, studying at the National Academy of State Administration of the President of Ukraine (2004).

Career 
He was the master of the power engineer department of Ukrremtrest of Derzhkomsilhosptekhnika in Kyiv City. He served in the military for 18 months. He worked as an engineer and executive at Agromash, rising to the position Director General. He served as an advisor to the State leasing company and NJSC Ukragroleasing. He served as deputy chairman of Verkhovna Rada Committee on Environmental Policy, Management of nature and Chernobyl disaster consequences. He served as chair of the State Committee of Ukraine for State Material Reserve. He served as the Deputy Minister of Agrarian Policy of Ukraine and as the Minister of Environmental Protection before becoming a deputy of the Kyiv City Council.

From 2002 to 2006 he moved among various factions and parties, as an adviser and a candidate. He served on the Management of nature and Chernobyl disaster consequences committee beginning in June 2002 and became the Deputy Head in 2004.

Accomplishments
Victor Boiko earned his fortune before he engaged in political activities.

As chairman of the State Committee of Ukraine for State Material Reserve he
 initiated a comprehensive inspection of the State Committee of Ukraine for State Material Reserve discovering arrears in the amount 7 bln. UAH;
 increased grain exports to about 400,000 tons in 2003–2004 and opened more than 4,000 stores where low-income families could buy sugar and flour for the lowest prices;
 increased pork exports.

As Minister of Environmental Protection of Ukraine he 
 expanded protected areas to 11% of the country;
 expanded recycling and improved landfill operations;
 established protection zones for nature reserves.
He was awarded the Honored Worker of Agriculture of Ukraine.

References

External links
Rada.gov.ua

1961 births
Living people
People from Kirovohrad Oblast
21st-century Ukrainian politicians
People's Party (Ukraine) politicians
National University of Life and Environmental Sciences of Ukraine alumni
Fourth convocation members of the Verkhovna Rada
Ecology and natural resources ministers of Ukraine